Abena Durowaa Mensah (born 21 June 1977) is a Ghanaian politician and a member of the New Patriotic Party. She was the member of parliament for Assin North Constituency.

Early life and education
Mensah was born on 21 June 1977 in Assin Kushea in the Central Region of Ghana. She holds a Diploma in Insurance from Ghana Insurance College, a professional Certificate in Marketing (CIM - UK ), and a bachelor's degree in marketing from Christian Service University College.

Career 
Mensah was the Manager for Esich Life Assurance in Sunyani.

Politics 
Mensah is a member of the New Patriotic Party. She was the Member of Parliament for Assin North Constituency from 2017 to 2021.

2016 elections 
In the 2016 Ghanaian general elections, she won the Assin North Constituency parliamentary seat with 15,553 votes making 56.8% of the total votes cast whilst the NDC parliamentary candidate Samuel Ambre had 10,751 votes making 39.2% of the total votes cast, the PPP parliamentary candidate Isaac Manu had 979 votes making 3.6% of the total votes cast and the CPP parliamentary candidate Sanni Mahama had 115 votes making 0.4% of the total votes cast.

2020 elections 
In the 2020 Ghanaian general election, she lost the Assin North Constituency seat to the NDC parliamentary candidate James Gyakye Quayson. She had 14,193 votes making 44.79% of the total votes cast.

Personal life 
Mensah is married with two children. She identifies as a Christian.

References

Living people
1977 births
New Patriotic Party politicians
Ghanaian MPs 2013–2017
Ghanaian MPs 2017–2021
21st-century Ghanaian women politicians
Women members of the Parliament of Ghana